Polymixia nobilis, the stout beardfish, is a species of beardfish. This species can grow over  TL. P. nobilis lives on both sides of the Atlantic Ocean on gravel and sandy bottoms. Scientists do not know how they behave or reproduce. The species's dorsal fin has five spines and 34-27 soft rays. The habitat of the fish is in the benthic zone.

References

Polymixiiformes
Fish described in 1838
Taxa named by Richard Thomas Lowe